The 2018 season was the Miami Dolphins' 49th in the National Football League, their 53rd overall and their third and last under head coach Adam Gase. During the offseason, the Dolphins tweaked their uniforms' orange color to better align with their classical past and history. For the second straight season, they also brought back their throwback uniforms from the Shula/Marino eras and wore them for three games.

With quarterback Ryan Tannehill playing for the first time since 2016, the highlight of the Dolphins' season came during a memorable Week 14 win against division rival and defending back-to-back AFC champion New England Patriots, which prevented the Patriots from clinching the AFC East that week. However, the Dolphins would lose all of their remaining games and missed the playoffs for the second consecutive year. The 7–9 finish was also the team's second consecutive losing season, with all 7 wins decided by one possession scores.

Roster changes

Signings

Departures

Draft

Draft trades
The Dolphins traded wide receiver Jarvis Landry to Cleveland in exchange for Cleveland's fourth-round selection they acquired from Carolina (123rd overall), and a 2019 7th round pick Cleveland originally acquired from Pittsburgh.
The Dolphins traded running back Jay Ajayi to Philadelphia in exchange for Philadelphia's fourth-round selection they acquired from New England (131st overall).
The Dolphins traded their fifth-round selection (147th overall) to New Orleans in exchange for linebacker Stephone Anthony.
The Dolphins traded the seventh-round selection they acquired from Tampa Bay (223rd overall) to San Francisco in exchange for San Francisco's seventh-round selection (227th overall) and center Daniel Kilgore.

Staff

Final roster

Preseason

Regular season
The Dolphins' 2018 schedule was finalized and announced on April 19.

Schedule

Note: Intra-division opponents are in bold text.

Game summaries

Week 1: vs. Tennessee Titans

Due to two weather delays, the game lasted for 7 hours and 10 minutes, the longest game since the AFL–NFL merger in 1970. Coincidentally, wide receiver Danny Amendola met with former teammates Malcolm Butler and Dion Lewis. The three played for the New England Patriots from 2015 to 2018 and helped them win Super Bowl LI over the Atlanta Falcons.

Week 2: at New York Jets

Week 3: vs. Oakland Raiders

With the win, the Dolphins improved to 3–0, their first such start since 2013.

Week 4: at New England Patriots

With their first loss of the season, the Dolphins failed to earn their first 4–0 start since 1995, during the Dan Marino era and Don Shula's final year as the Dolphins' head coach.

Week 5: at Cincinnati Bengals

Week 6: vs. Chicago Bears

A last-second field goal kick by Jason Saunders barely averted a tie and gave the Dolphins the win in overtime.

Week 7: vs. Detroit Lions

The Dolphins were seeking their first win over the Lions since 2006.

Week 8: at Houston Texans

Week 9: vs. New York Jets

Week 10: at Green Bay Packers

Week 12: at Indianapolis Colts

Week 13: vs. Buffalo Bills

Week 14: vs. New England Patriots

Week 15: at Minnesota Vikings
This was the Dolphins' first loss to the Vikings since 2002.

Week 16: vs. Jacksonville Jaguars

With the loss, the Dolphins were eliminated from playoff contention.

Week 17: at Buffalo Bills

This season finale marked the final games of players such as quarterback Ryan Tannehill, linebacker Cameron Wake, and head coach Adam Gase all in Dolphins uniforms.

Standings

Division

Conference

References

External links
 

Miami
Miami Dolphins seasons
Miami Dolphins